Heriades parvula is a species of leaf-cutting bee in the genus Heriades, of the family Megachilidae. It is also spelled Heriades parvulus.

References

External links
 http://www.atlashymenoptera.net/biblio/Karunaratne_et_al_2006_Sri_Lanka.pdf
 https://www.academia.edu/7390502/AN_UPDATED_CHECKLIST_OF_BEES_OF_SRI_LANKA_WITH_NEW_RECORDS
 https://species.wikimedia.org/wiki/Heriades

Megachilidae
Insects of Sri Lanka
Hymenoptera of Asia
Insects described in 1873